Arnon Avron (born 1952) is an Israeli mathematician and Professor at the School of Computer Science at Tel Aviv University. His research focuses on applications of mathematical logic to computer science and artificial intelligence.

Biography
Born in Tel Aviv in 1952, Arnon Avron studied mathematics at Tel Aviv University and the Hebrew University of Jerusalem, receiving a Ph.D. magna cum laude from Tel Aviv University in 1985. Between 1986 and 1988, he was a visitor at the University of Edinburgh's Laboratory for Foundations of Computer Science, where he began his association with computer science.

In 1988 he became a senior faculty member of the Department of Computer Science (later School of Computer Science) of Tel Aviv University, chairing the School in 1996–1998, and becoming a Full Professor in 1999.

Research
Avron's research interests include proof theory, automated reasoning, non-classical logics, foundations of mathematics, and applications of mathematical logic in computer science and artificial intelligence. Arnon made a significant contribution to the theory of automated reasoning with his introduction of hypersequents, a generalization of the sequent calculus. Avron also introduced the use of bilattices to paraconsistent logic, and made contributions to predicative set theory and geometry.

Selected works

Books

Articles

References

1952 births
Living people
Einstein Institute of Mathematics alumni
Israeli computer scientists
Israeli Jews
Israeli mathematicians
Mathematical logicians
Tel Aviv University alumni
Academic staff of Tel Aviv University